Dan Duryea (January 23, 1907 – June 7, 1968) was an American actor in film, stage, and television. Known for portraying a vast range of character roles as a villain, he nonetheless had a long career in a wide variety of leading and secondary roles.

Early life
Duryea was born and raised in White Plains, New York. He graduated from White Plains High School in 1924 and Cornell University in 1928. While at Cornell, Duryea was elected into the prestigious Sphinx Head Society, Cornell's oldest senior honor society. He majored in English with a strong interest in drama, and in his senior year succeeded Franchot Tone as president of the college drama society.

As his parents did not approve of his choice to pursue an acting career, Duryea became an advertising executive. After six stress-filled years, he had a heart attack that sidelined him for a year.

Acting career

Stage
Returning to his earlier love of acting and the stage, Duryea made his name on Broadway in the play Dead End, followed by The Little Foxes, in which he portrayed Leo Hubbard. He also appeared on Broadway in Many Mansions (1937) and Missouri Legend (1938).

Film 

In 1940, Duryea moved to Hollywood to appear in the film version of The Little Foxes. He continued to establish himself with supporting and secondary roles in films such as The Pride of the Yankees (1942) and None But the Lonely Heart (1944). As the 1940s progressed, he found his niche as the "sniveling, deliberately taunting" antagonist in a number of films noir (Scarlet Street, The Woman in the Window, The Great Flamarion, Criss Cross, Too Late for Tears, Johnny Stool Pigeon), and Westerns such as Along Came Jones and Black Bart, although he was sometimes cast in more sympathetic roles (Black Angel, One Way Street). In 1946, exhibitors voted him the eighth most promising "star of tomorrow".

Duryea co-starred opposite Gary Cooper three times in the 1940s: Ball of Fire, Pride of the Yankees and Along Came Jones. In the 1950s, Duryea co-starred with James Stewart in three films, Winchester '73 (as the dastardly "Waco Johnny" Dean), Thunder Bay, and Night Passage. He was featured in several other westerns, including Silver Lode, Ride Clear of Diablo, and The Marauders, and in more film-noir productions like 36 Hours, Chicago Calling, Storm Fear, and The Burglar.

When interviewed by Hedda Hopper in the early 1950s, Duryea spoke of career goals and his preparation for roles:
Well, first of all, let's set the stage or goal I set for myself when I decided to become an actor ... not just 'an actor', but a successful one. I looked in the mirror and knew with my "puss" and 155-pound weakling body, I couldn't pass for a leading man, and I had to be different. And I sure had to be courageous, so I chose to be the meanest s.o.b. in the movies ... strictly against my mild nature, as I'm an ordinary, peace-loving husband and father. Inasmuch, as I admired fine actors like Richard Widmark, Victor Mature, Robert Mitchum, and others who had made their early marks in the dark, sordid, and guilt-ridden world of film noir; here, indeed, was a market for my talents. I thought the meaner I presented myself, the tougher I was with women, slapping them around in well produced films where evil and death seem to lurk in every nightmare alley and behind every venetian blind in every seedy apartment, I could find a market for my screen characters.... At first it was very hard as I am a very even-tempered guy, but I used my past life experiences to motivate me as I thought about some of the people I hated in my early as well as later life ... like the school bully who used to try and beat the hell out of me at least once a week ... a sadistic family doctor that believed feeling pain when he treated you was the birthright of every man inasmuch as women suffered giving birth ... little incidents with trade-people who enjoyed acting superior because they owned their business, overcharging you. Then the one I used when I had to slap a woman around was easy! I was slapping the over-bearing teacher who would fail you in their 'holier-than-thou' class and enjoy it! And especially the experiences I had dealing with the unbelievable pompous 'know-it-all-experts' that I dealt with during my advertising agency days ... almost going 'nuts' trying to please these 'corporate heads' until I finally got out of that racket!"

In his last years, Duryea reteamed with Stewart for the adventure film The Flight of the Phoenix, about men stranded in the Sahara desert by a downed airplane, appearing as a mild-mannered accountant, closer to his real-life persona. He worked in overseas film productions including the British neo-noir thriller Do You Know This Voice? (1964), the Italian Western The Hills Run Red, aka Un Fiume di dollari, (1966) and the spy thriller Five Golden Dragons (1967) in West Germany, while continuing to find roles on American television. He also appeared twice on the big screen with his son, character actor Peter Duryea, in the low-budget Westerns Taggart (1964) and The Bounty Killer (1965).

Television
Duryea starred as the lead character China Smith in the television series China Smith from 1952 to 1953 and The New Adventures of China Smith from 1954 to 1956.

He later guest-starred as Roy Budinger, the self-educated mastermind of a criminal ring dealing in silver bullion, in the episode "Terror Town" on October 18, 1958 of NBC's western series Cimarron City. On season 1, episode 15 of Wagon Train, he guest-starred as the title character in "The Cliff Grundy Story" (December 1957).

In 1959, Duryea appeared as an alcoholic gunfighter in third episode of The Twilight Zone, "Mr. Denton on Doomsday". He guest starred on NBC's anthology series The Barbara Stanwyck Show and appeared in an episode of Rawhide in 1959, "Incident Of The Executioner." On September 15, 1959, Duryea guest-starred as the outlaw Bud Carlin in the episode "Stage Stop", the premiere of NBC's Laramie western series. Duryea appeared again as Luke Gregg on Laramie on October 25, 1960, in the episode "The Long Riders". Duryea also put in a great comic performance in The Alfred Hitchcock Hour in an episode called "Three Wives Too Many" (1964).

Three weeks later, on November 16, 1960, Duryea played a mentally unstable pioneer obsessed by demons and superstitions in "The Bleymier Story" of NBC's Wagon Train. Elen Willard played his daughter; James Drury, his daughter's suitor. Duryea was cast twice in 1960 as Captain Brad Turner in consecutive episodes of the NBC western series Riverboat. He spoofed his tough-guy image in a comedy sketch about a robbery on the Dec. 4, 1960 episode of The Jack Benny Program. Dan also guest starred in a 1962 episode of Tales of Wells Fargo TV western series as Marshal Blake opposite Dale Robertson.

In 1963, Duryea portrayed Dr. Ben Lorrigan on NBC's medical drama, The Eleventh Hour. In 1967, a television version of Winchester '73 was released in which Duryea played the part of Bart McAdam, an uncle to Lin and Dakin McAdam. A notable co-star in the film was John Saxon (Dakin McAdam). From 1967 to 1968, he appeared in a recurring role as Eddie Jacks on the soap opera Peyton Place.

Personal life
Duryea was different from the unsavoury characters he often portrayed. He was married for 35 years to his wife, Helen, until her death in January 1967. The couple had two sons: Peter (who worked for a time as an actor), and Richard, a talent agent. At home, Duryea lived a quiet life at his house in the San Fernando Valley, devoting himself to gardening, boating, and community activities including, at various times, active membership in the local parent-teacher association and Scout Master of a Boy Scout troop.

On June 7, 1968, Duryea died of cancer at the age of 61. The New York Times tellingly noted the passing of a "heel with sex appeal." His remains are interred in Forest Lawn - Hollywood Hills Cemetery in Los Angeles. His headstone reads: "DAN DURYEA 1907-1968 OUR POP A MAN EVERYBODY LOVED."

Complete filmography

Partial television appearances

China Smith (1952–1956) as China Smith
Schlitz Playhouse of Stars (1952–1956) as Pete Richards / Federal Agent Sam Ireland
The New Adventures of China Smith (1953–1954) as China Smith
December Bride, episode "High Sierras" (1955) as himself
Wagon Train (1957–1964) as Sam Race / Amos / Samuel Bleymier / Joshua Gilliam / Survivor / Cliff Grundy
Zane Grey Theater, episode "This Man Must Die" (1958) as Kirk Joiner
Laramie, "Stage Stop" (1959) as Bud Carlin
Walt Disney's Wonderful World of Color, "Texas John Slaughter: Showdown at Sandoval" (1959) as Dan Trask
The Twilight Zone, "Mr. Denton on Doomsday" (1959) as Al Denton
Laramie, "The Long Riders" (1960) as Luke Gregg 
Bonanza, in the episode "Badge Without Honor" (1960) as U.S. Dep. Marshall Gerald Eskith and in the episode "Logan's Treasure" (1964) as Sam Logan
Route 66, "Don't Count Stars" (1961) as Mike McKay
Zane Grey Theater, "Knight of the Sun" (1961) as Henry Jacob HanleyLaramie, "The Mountain Men" (1961) as Ben Sanford Naked City, "Daughter, Am I In My Father's House?" (1962) as Clyde RoydTales of Wells Fargo,  "Winter Storm" (1962) as Marshal BlakeRawhide,"Incident of Prophecy" (1963) as a prophet who predicts death of drover acquitted in accidental shootingRoute 66, "A Cage in Search of a Bird" (1963) as Jay Leonard RingsbyGoing My Way, "Mr. Second Chance" (1963) as Harold HarrisonThe Alfred Hitchcock Hour, "Three Wives Too Many" (1964) as Raymond BrownCombat! (TV series), in the episode "Dateline" (1965) as Barton and in the episode "A Little Jazz" (1967) as Bernie WallacePeyton Place (1967–1968) as Eddie Jacks

Radio performances
 Suspense, "The Man Who Couldn't Lose" (1947)
 The Man from Homicide (1951)
 Suspense, "Remember Me" (1952)

References

Notes

Bibliography

 Maltin, Leonard. "Dan Duryea". Leonard Maltin's Movie Encyclopedia.'' New York: Dutton, 1994. .

Further reading

External links

Dan Duryea Central

Duryea interview

Photographs and literature on Dan Duryea
Dan Duryea Article on "Western Clippings"

1907 births
1968 deaths
American male film actors
American male television actors
Deaths from cancer in California
Cornell University alumni
People from Greater Los Angeles
People from White Plains, New York
Male Western (genre) film actors
Burials at Forest Lawn Memorial Park (Hollywood Hills)
20th-century American male actors
White Plains High School alumni